The sixth season of American Ninja Warrior premiered on NBC on May 26, 2014. Matt Iseman returned for his sixth season as host, while Akbar Gbaja-Biamila and Jenn Brown each returned for their second season. Similar to previous seasons, the winner receives $500,000 and the coveted title, "American Ninja Warrior".

Cities
In addition to the five cities (Venice Beach, Dallas, St. Louis, Miami, and Denver), the national finals were held once again in Las Vegas, Nevada.

Obstacles

City Qualifying & Finals

National Finals

City Qualifying
Regional competitions were held in the following five locations to determine the 90 competitors to participate in the qualifying rounds: Venice Beach, CA, Dallas, TX, St. Louis, MO, Miami, FL, and Denver, CO. The top 30 competitors that went the farthest the fastest would move on to the finals rounds.

Venice Beach Qualifying

Dallas Qualifying

St. Louis Qualifying

Miami Qualifying

Denver Qualifying

City Qualifying Leaderboard

City Finals
The 30 competitors from qualifying in each city tackled an extended course, featuring four new additional obstacles like the Salmon Ladder and Spider Climb. The top 15 competitors that went the farthest the fastest would move on to the national finals in Las Vegas.

Venice Beach Finals

Dallas Finals

St. Louis Finals

Miami Finals

Denver Finals

City Finals Leaderboard

Notable achievements

Truss builder Stephen France made ANW history when he became the first amputee ever to compete with a prosthetic limb in the qualifying round in Miami. Also ANW Trainer Drew Drechsel sets the second fastest time in any qualifier with 0:44.24 run, only seconds behind Michael "Frosti" Zernow who had the fastest time on season three in the Venice qualifiers. At 52 years old, Jon Stewart became the oldest person to complete a Finals Course. Chris and Brian Wilczewski, "The Wilczewski Brothers", became the first brothers ever to make it to Mount Midoriyama together.

Notable competitors
 U.S. Olympic luger Kate Hansen 
 5-time ANW veteran David Campbell 
 The Biggest Loser personal trainer Kim Lyons 
 former American Gladiator champion and gladiator Evan "Rocket" Dollard 
 U.S. Olympic bobsledder Johnny Quinn
 U.S. Olympic gymnast Jonathan Horton 
 U.S. Olympic gymnast Terin Humphrey 
 4-time ANW veteran Brent Steffensen
 professional wrestler Matt Capiccioni 
 professional wakeboarder Shaun Murray 
 retired-MLB baseball player Rich Thompson 
 U.S. Olympic luger Preston Griffall 
 professional BMX rider Morgan Wade 
 professional MMA fighter Michelle Waterson
 U.S. Olympic snowboarder Faye Gulini
 MMA fighter Jason Soares

Women's success
This season, the women who attempted the Warped Wall (obstacle #6) from last season competed. Three women out of 100 have completed the course. Former NCAA gymnast Kacy Catanzaro made ANW history when she became the first woman to complete the qualifying course, making it up the Warped Wall on her second try at 5:26.18 at the Dallas qualifiers, ranking her 21 out of 30; this also makes her the first woman to make it up the Warped Wall. Catanzaro became the second woman to attempt the finals course and the first to complete it, which she did with a time of 8:59.53, ranking her 7th out of 15. This made her the first woman to advance to Mount Midoriyama in Las Vegas. She failed to complete the 1st round of the finals, in Las Vegas while attempting the Jumping Spider.

Event coordinator Michelle Warnky became the second woman to finish the qualifying course, making it up the Warped Wall on her first try in a faster time (3:08.94) than Catanzaro at the St. Louis qualifiers, ranking her 19th out of 30. She also became the second woman ever to attempt the Salmon Ladder in the finals, coming up just inches short. She did receive a wild-card spot in Las Vegas, but she overshot on her dismount to the landing pad on the Silk Slider.

Rock climbing instructor Meagan Martin became the third woman to finish the course, making it up the Warped Wall on her third and final try at 4:46.29 at the Denver qualifiers, ranking her 22nd out of 30; she also became the first woman in ANW to complete the Devil Steps. However, in the Denver Finals, she came up short and fell at the Spikes into Cargo. She received a wild-card spot in Las Vegas, and became the first American woman to complete the Jumping Spider, but ran out of time on the Warped Wall.

In addition, Melanie Hunt and Courtney Venuti both made it to the Warped Wall in Miami Qualifying, but both of them couldn't get up it and advance. Hunt competed the last 2 seasons, going out on the 2nd obstacle both times and Venuti competed in Season 5. Amy Pajcic also made it to the Warped Wall in the St. Louis Qualifying, but couldn't make it up.

Before Catanzaro, Warnky, and Martin, the only woman to have beaten an American Ninja Warrior or Sasuke stage, trial, or qualifier was former Super Sentai stuntwoman Chie Nishimura (who beat Sasuke Stage 1 in 1998). Not even Kunoichi champions Rie Komiya or Ayako Miyake had managed it.

Mount Midoriyama

Stage 1
Competitors in Bold finished the City Finals.

Stage 2

Leaderboard

Stage 3

Note: Moravsky was only the third American Ninja Warrior competitor to complete the Ultimate Cliffhanger.

Ratings

References

American Ninja Warrior
2014 American television seasons